Heather Kadin (born August 7, 1972) is an American television producer and film producer. She co-executive produces  Star Trek: Discovery.

Life and career

Kadin was born on August 7, 1972, in Scottsdale, Arizona. Before being President of the production company, K/O Paper Products, she was an executive producer at ABC. Kadin had previously worked with Alex Kurtzman and Roberto Orci together at ABC, where as a drama executive, was involved in J. J. Abrams' spy series Alias, on which Kurtzman and Orci were writer-producers since the first episode. For a brief time, before joining ABC, she had worked at the television division of Shady Acres Entertainment, which at that time, was based at Touchstone Television. She had left Warner Bros. Television where she served as vice president of drama development in 2010. Kadin worked with Kurtzman and Orci on the WBTV-produced Fringe, which Kurtzman and Orci co-created with Abrams.

Kadin is the executive producer of Sleepy Hollow since its beginning in 2013, Matador in 2014, Scorpion since 2014, and Limitless since 2015. She executive produced TV movie the Exit Strategy where she worked with David Guggenheim, Kurtzman, Orci, and director Antoine Fuqua in 2015. Kadin executive produced the TV movie Tales from the Darkside where she worked with Joe Hill and director Bradley Buecker in 2015.

Kadin co-executive produces Star Trek: Discovery with Kurtzman for CBS. It is the first television series to launch on a broadcast network but air primarily on a video-on-demand service, on CBS All Access. She also serves as an Executive Producer on the CBS series Clarice which debuted in February 2021.

Personal life
She lives in Sherman Oaks, California with her husband and two sons.

Filmography

Film credits

Television credits

References

External links

 
 

1972 births
Living people
Writers from Scottsdale, Arizona
Showrunners
American women television producers
American women television writers
Screenwriters from Arizona
21st-century American screenwriters
21st-century American women writers
Television producers from Arizona